Paradoris mollis is a species of sea slug, a dorid nudibranch, shell-less marine opisthobranch gastropod mollusks in the family Discodorididae.

Taxonomy
Defended as valid by Valdés (2002) but considered a synonym of Paradoris indecora by Dayrat (2006)

Distribution
This marine species occurs off Tenerife, Canary Islands.

References

 Ortea J. (1995). Estudio de las especies atlanticas de Paradoris Bergh, 1884 (Mollusca: Nudibranchia: Discodorididae) recolectadas en las Islas Canarias. Avicennia 3: 5-28
 Valdés Á. (2002). A phylogenetic analysis and systematic revision of the cryptobranch dorids (Mollusca, Nudibranchia, Anthobranchia). Zoological Journal of the Linnean Society. 136: 535–636.
 Dayrat B. (2006). A taxonomic revision of Paradoris sea slugs (Mollusca, Gastropoda, Nudibranchia, Doridina).. Zoological Journal of the Linnean Society 147: 125-238

External links
 Gofas, S.; Le Renard, J.; Bouchet, P. (2001). Mollusca. in: Costello, M.J. et al. (eds), European Register of Marine Species: a check-list of the marine species in Europe and a bibliography of guides to their identification. Patrimoines Naturels. 50: 180-213

Discodorididae
Gastropods described in 1995